Major Mian Kifait Ali (July 1902 – 1 December 1994) was a pioneer of the Pakistan movement, his masterpiece book "Confederacy of India" published in 1939, under the pen name "A Punjabi" was the first to deal with political, economic and administrative aspects of Pakistan.

He was amongst the first to respond to the call of Pakistan sounded by Muhammad Iqbal in 1930 (Qutote from Chaudhry Muhammad Ali, Prime Minister of Pakistan), Dr. Khursheed kamal aziz Pakistan's official historian) has described this book as "the most comprehensive and far reaching scheme aimed at furthering and elaborating the idea of Pakistan.  Waheed uz-Zaman wrote in his book, "Pakistan", Lahore, 1964, P. 168, "The book was taken into consideration by the Muslim league, while preparing the Lahore resolution and the fact the solution proposed in the confederacy of India" differed but little from the proposed by the Muslim League in March 1940. The venear of a Confederacy, which was the main theme of his scheme, could anytime be set aside and the remainder would have precisely ... Pakistan.  So scholarly and so cogent was his reasoning that men like Dr.Rajendra Prasad felt compelled to join issues with him in his books, (Pakistan(Bombay and Calcutta, September 1940), p 34; see also his book "India Divided" page 180-181). The book was reviewed in leading newspapers and journals. Comparatively more scholarly appraisal was in the Tarjaman-ul-Quran of Maulana Abul Ala Maududi. According to Mian Kifait Ali "The idea was suggested to me by the late Choudhary Rahmat Ali's writings and I developmed it to an extent to which no one had done earlier (Letter to Dr. K.K, September 5, 1968)". Ali also stated that originally it was proposed to publish the book under the title of "Pakistan" a typed manuscript which bore this page title was sent to the press. Soon after he received a telegraphic message from the Muhammad Ali Jinnah that book should not appear under the pen name of "Pakistan". It was to comply with the Quaid's directive he prepared a federal scheme and was incorporated in the introduction of the book. Thus the book was titled as "Confederacy of India". (Nation article, 23 December 1994 by Sarfraz Hussain Mirza, "Confederacy of India by A Punjabi", also in Daily Times, Cam Diary, "Pak history in Leichester", and article by V.P Bhatia "'Jinnah was against the name 'Pakistan' at First". It was in recognition of this work of Mian Kifait Ali that he was invited to work on the committee presided over by Sir Abdullah Haroon set up in February 1940 to examine the various schemes of constitutional reforms for India and to see whether a consolidated scheme can finally be framed.  His book has been referred to as the most comprehensive schemes at demystifying and detailing the ideas regarding the inception of Pakistan, quite a lot has been written about him and his work. Mian Kifait Ali has done "pioneering work in the evolution of Muslim political thoughts and has suffered the hardship of a pioneer… when an objective appraisal of Muslim political movement is made by the historian. He will find an honourable place among the pioneers and selfless workers in this great field of Muslim reconstruction (Quoted by Governor Punjab, Mushtaq Ahmed Gurmani). Famous independence-era personalities such as Abul Ala Maududi, Chaudhry Muhammad Ali, Dr. Rajendra Prasad, Vengalil Krishnan Krishna Menon, and Sardar V. Patel took issue with him. He responded in several pamphlets.

Life

Mian Kifait Ali was born the 1902 in a middle class Rajput family of Batala, district Gurdaspur, now in East Punjab. After taking his B.A, degree from the Islamia College, Lahore, he joined Law College in the same city, but soon compelled to give up his legal studies by the death of his father who was a tehsildar in the Punjab. He secured a subordinate appointment in the office of the Punjab Legislative Council, his meager earnings were distributed among publishing his manuscripts, books, gazettes, which were distributed free of cost throughout India and also the enormous burden of raising, educating his eight orphaned brothers and sisters left behind by his father. He had an inquisitive and creative mind, but was handicapped by his family responsibilities from entering the practical political field, and therefore decided to project his views through his pen. During these hard times he wrote The Confederacy of India and other work of same kind. He was influenced by the ideas of Iqbal, the debates of Punjab legislative council, his close association with his colleague Hari Chand Akhttar and Sir, Fazil-Hussain. In 1940 he joined the inter-services, Public Relation directorate at the military headquarters in New Dheli as a commissioned officer.  Mian Sahib started his writing career by publishing a book "Hindustan Aur Deegar Afsanay" consisting of short social stories. From 1936 to 1942 he wrote seven books and pamphlets and contributed number of articles to the New Times of Malik Barkat Ali, and Lahore weekly. Monday Morning also featured some of Ali's work and was edited by Mr. Bedi and Mrs. Freda Bedi jointly regarding the Muslim problems in India and on separation. Ali's first political writing was "Hindustan aur Milliyyat", published from Lahore. This book is a detailed thesis on Nationalism and contains a discussion of the common nationhood of Hindus and Muslims, was published in 1936. His life can be divided into four main periods.

1) 1936 through 1947. During this period he relentlessly worked for the movement of Pakistan and several books and pamphlets. After the creation of Pakistan in 1947, he formed a political party named "Hari Sari Party".
 1936 – Hindustan Aur Milidat (Urdu language book)
 1939 – Confederacy of India (English language book)
 1939 – Pakistan (Urdu language pamphlet)
 1941 – Pakistan: The Critics case examined (English language pamphlet)
 1942 – Separation, Socialism and Islam (English language pamphlet)
 1942 – Separation, a Reply to its critics (English language pamphlet)
 1942 – Sir Sikandar’s Scheme under searchlight (English language pamphlet).
 1949 – Constitution of Hari Sari Party (Urdu and English language pamphlet).
2) After many years Ali again put his pen at the disposal of the political controversy. In 1955, he wrote many pamphlets in English as well as Urdu in the favour of one unit. In other words, the decision to consolidate all areas of West Pakistan. His political struggle during this period was reconciliation (or lack thereof) between the Lahore Resolution of 1940 and the Delhi Resolution of 1946. He was constantly inquiring as to why these events left ambiguity in the separation process. He predicted the formation of Bangla Desh in 1953.
 1955 – A series of five pamphlets in English language, "West Pakistan", "One Unit Scheme", "Pakistan in Retrospect and Prospect", "Consolidation of West Pakistan", and Financial advantage of One Unit"
 1955 – A series of two pamphlets in Urdu language, "Mughrabi Pakistan" and "Wahditi Nizam-i-Hkumat".
 1956 – "A Review of the States Re-organization Commission (India) 1955" (English language pamphlet)
 1956 – "Pakistan's Defense Potential and Security Problems" (English language pamphlet)
 1956 – "Political Background of Pakistan and its Provinces" (English language pamphlet)
 1964 – "Transfer of an Evacuee Property" (English language pamphlet)
3) 1965 through 1973. In this period he wrote two major pamphlets and several series newspaper articles published in "Nawai-e-Waqat", "Nida-i-Milat", "Pakistan Times", and Civil and Military Gazette".
 1967 – "Six Point Formulae X-Rayed". (English language pamphlet, also published in Bengali)
 1971 – "Pakistan vs. Bangla Desh" (English language pamphlet)
4) 1974 through 1985. Mian Sahib took the separation of East Pakistan to his heart and become aloof. During this period he wrote a manuscript for a book in English, which never got published.  With the onset of Alzheimer's disease, he produced no further works. Mian Kifiat Ali is but it is a fact that he helped shape Pakistan's backbone. Mian Kifiat Ali is a hero that has been lost Pakistan's history. He died in Delaware, USA and his earthly remains are buried in Lahore, Pakistan.

References 

Reginald Coupland, Indian politics 1936–1942 (London, 1943), p, 203
B.M.Chaudry, Muslim Politics in India (Calcutta, June 1946). P.60
Ram Gopal, Indian Muslims (Bombay, 1959), p, 271
K.B.Sayeed, Pakistan: The formative phase (Karachi, 1960), p, 119.
See Syed Shraifuddin Pirzada, Evolution of Pakistan (Lahore, 1963), pp 167–172,
Syed Sharifudin Pirzada, The Pakistan Resolution and the Historic Lahore Session (Karachi, March 1968), p 10fn34, this obviously a misprint
See Waheeduzzaman, op, cit., p. 165. In the bibliography his notes on the Confederacy of India runs, “author not identified”, p. 239,
Akthar Waqar Azeem, “Tasawwar-e-Pakistan, Manzil be Manzil “, Imroze (Lahore, 14 August 1968.
Syed Sharifuddin Pirzada, the Pakistan Resolution and the Historic Lahore Session (Karachi, March 1968), p 11. But unhappily the was spoilt by a misprint,
A.S.M. Abdur Rab, A.K. Fazalul Haq (Lahore, n.d. 1966), p. 101,
Dr. K.K Aziz, Scrutiny, “A 1939 Scheme of Confederation of India” (University of Islamabad) pp 89 – 113.

1902 births
1994 deaths
Pakistani writers
Pakistan Movement activists from Punjab